Ottniell Jürissaar (27 March 1924 – 7 September 2014) was an Estonian poet, composer, and conductor.

Early life and education
Ottniell Jürissaar was born in Tartu. His father, Johannes Jürissaar, was an inventor and small-scale industrialist. His mother Silvi (née Juhainen) was Finnish. 

He attended primary school in Elva, graduating in 1938. In 1943, he graduated from Hugo Treffner Gymnasium. He briefly studied singing at the Tallinn Conservatory under instruction of Ott Raukas and was a candidate for the composition class of Heino Eller before World War II interrupted his studies.

Career and imprisonment
In 1943, Jürissaar, along with some forty classmates volunteered as soldiers of the Finnish Infantry Regiment 200. After the war, he became part of the Forest Brothers anti-Soviet partisan group. He was captured and sentenced to five to ten years forced labor at a prison camp in Mordovia. He was released in 1954. Ottniell Jürissaar wrote about 300 songs and instrumental pieces during his imprisonment and exile, including two operettas.

From 1960 to 1971, Jürissaar worked as a teacher in Russian schools in Kohtla-Järve. He conducted the mixed choir 'Heli' and the female choir 'Kaja'. Jürissaar then  moved From Kohtla-Järve to Tallinn. In the early 1990s, he led the Memento Tallinn Association ensemble 'Memento'. Jürissaar wrote a number of poetry collections and memoirs, including about the Forest Brother period and his experiences in the prison camps. His stories and poetry have also been translated into Finnish and English. He has also written several children's books.

Personal life and death
Ottniell Jürissaar was a member of the Estonian Reform Party from 2013 until his death in 2014. He was buried at Tallinn's Forest Cemetery.

Awards 
Order of the White Star, Medal Class (2000)

Books 
 Alleaa-Kallermaa, published 1990, Illustrated by Asta Vender
 Kaduviku sillal: kirjutatud metsas, vanglas, laagris (On the Bridge of Disappearance: Written in the Forest, Prison, and Camp), published 1990, compiled and edited by Urve Hermann, designed by A. Ilo 
 Kevadetüdrukud (Spring Girls), published 1993, design and illustrations by Aarne Mesikäpp 
 Rännulugusid ja vemmalvärsse (Travel Stories and Doggerel Verses), published 1991, designed by Aarne Mesikäpp
 Sada sonetti (One Hundred Sonnets), published 1992,  designs and illustrations by Aarne Mesikäpp 
 Suupillilugu (A Harmonica Story), published 2000, illustrations by Heli Kase

Selected sheet music
 Laule trellide ja okastraadi tagant (Songs Behind Bars and Barbed Wire), 1989
 Metsavennalaulud (Forest Brotherhood Songs), 1990
 Noorusmälestusi Soomest: 20 akordionipala (Youth Memories of Finland: 20 Accordion Pieces), 1991

References

1924 births
2014 deaths
Estonian male poets
20th-century Estonian poets
20th-century Estonian composers
Estonian choral conductors
Estonian songwriters
Estonian children's writers
Hugo Treffner Gymnasium alumni
Estonian anti-communists
Soviet dissidents
Gulag detainees
Estonian prisoners and detainees
Estonian people of Finnish descent
Recipients of the Order of the White Star, Medal Class
Burials at Metsakalmistu
Musicians from Tartu
Writers from Tartu